BREN Tower was a guyed steel framework mast,  high, on the Nevada Test Site in Nevada, USA. "BREN" stands for "Bare Reactor Experiment, Nevada." The structure was owned by the Department of Energy and maintained by National Security Technologies. Access to the tower area had been closed since July 2006. No reason for the closure has been given.  As part of the Nevada Test Site, it was also located in restricted airspace (R-4808N).

History
Built by the Dresser-Ideco Company for the U.S. Atomic Energy Commission, it was first erected in 1962 in the atomic bomb test area at Yucca Flat, where it was used for an experiment intended to improve understanding the effects of radiation in the atomic bombing of Hiroshima. A bare (unshielded) nuclear reactor on a hoist car could be moved to different heights on the tower; Japanese-type houses were built near the base of the tower and were bombarded with various intensities of radiation.

After the Nuclear Test Ban Treaty banned open-air nuclear testing, the tower was dismantled and despite its immense size moved from its original location to Jackass Flats in Area 25 of the Nevada Test Site, where it was used for Operation HENRE (High Energy Neutron Reactions Experiment), a series of radiation measurement experiments using a small linear accelerator to provide neutrons.

Specifications
Constructed of fifty-one  sections of high tensile steel, the structure was higher than the  Empire State Building. The tower weighed 345 tons (313 tonnes).

Demolition
The structure was demolished on May 23, 2012. The National Nuclear Security Administration listed reasons for the removal as safety concerns for nearby workers, unreasonable costs to restore the structure to working condition and hazards to air traffic.

See also
 United States tallest structures
 List of masts

References

External links

 
 http://www.skyscraperpage.com/diagrams/?b576

Towers completed in 1962
Towers in Nevada
Nuclear research reactors
Relocated buildings and structures in Nevada
Nevada Test Site
Buildings and structures demolished in 2012
Former towers
1962 establishments in Nevada
2012 disestablishments in Nevada